The Champion Liar is a 1920 American short silent Western film directed by and starring Hoot Gibson for Universal Film Manufacturing Co.

Cast
 Hoot Gibson
 Jim Corey
 Dorothy Wood
 Andrew Waldron
 Jack Walters
 Ida Tenbrook

See also
 List of American films of 1920
 Hoot Gibson filmography

External links
 

1920 films
1920 Western (genre) films
1920 short films
American silent short films
American black-and-white films
Films directed by Hoot Gibson
Silent American Western (genre) films
1920s American films